Hull Ionians is  a rugby union club in the East Riding of Yorkshire, England. The first team play in English rugby's National League 2 North, the fourth tier of the English rugby union system, following their relegation from National League 1 at the end of the 2019–20 season. Their home ground is Brantingham Park, which opened in September 1995 and is in the village of Brantingham, which is off the A63 road between Brough and South Cave.

History
Hull Ionians was formed in 1989 by the merger of Hull and East Riding with Ionians.

The club has played in the upper echelons of regional rugby throughout its history but in 2012–13 the club won National Division 2 North and were promoted to National League 1 for season 2013–14. They were immediately relegated back to National League 2 North but were promoted the following season, playing at the third level of English club rugby for the second time.

Honours
 North 1 v Midlands 1 promotion play-off winners (2): 2001–02, 2004–05
 National League 2 North champions (3): 2012–13, 2014–15, 2018–19

Current standings

References

External links
 Official website

1989 establishments in England
English rugby union teams
Rugby clubs established in 1989
Rugby union in Yorkshire
Sport in Kingston upon Hull